The Deerhaven Subdivision is a railroad line owned by CSX Transportation in Florida. At its north end it continues south from the Brooker Subdivision and at its south end the track comes to an end.

History

The Deerhaven Subdivision was originally built as part the Live Oak, Tampa and Charlotte Harbor Railroad in the early 1880s by Henry B. Plant.  It was the final segment of Plant's first rail line into Florida, which originated in Du Pont, Georgia.  The line connected to the Florida Southern Railway in Gainesville.  Plant's system of railroads would eventually become part of the Atlantic Coast Line Railroad in 1899.  The Atlantic Coast Line would become part of CSX by 1986.

See also
 List of CSX Transportation lines

References

CSX Transportation lines
Rail infrastructure in Florida
Atlantic Coast Line Railroad